Qaifah Al Mahn Ladhahrh is a sub-district located in the Al Quraishyah District, Al Bayda Governorate, Yemen. Qaifah Al Mahn Ladhahrh had a population of 2663 according to the 2004 census.

References 

Sub-districts in Al Quraishyah District